The Sudanese Awakening Revolutionary Council (SARC) is an armed militia in Darfur, Sudan, led by Sudanese Arab tribal chief Musa Hilal. It was founded in January 2014, and maintains control over the towns of Kutum, Kabkabiya and Saraf Umra.

References

2014 establishments in Sudan
Arab militant groups
Rebel groups in Sudan
War in Darfur